Ellipse is the third studio album from British singer-songwriter Imogen Heap. After returning from a round the world writing trip, Heap completed the album at her childhood home in Essex, converting her old playroom in the basement into a studio. The album got its name from the distinctive elliptical shape of the house.
The album's title was confirmed by Heap via her Twitter page on 25 April 2009, after being leaked onto the internet on 23 April. On 15 June, Heap confirmed that the album would be released on 24 August 2009 in the United Kingdom on Megaphonic Records and 25 August in North America on RCA Records and Epic Records and distributed by Sony BMG.

Subject matter in the songs includes post break-up malaise ("Wait It Out"), domestic boredom ("Little Bird"), body image issues ("Bad Body Double") and a common Heap theme, unrequited love ("Swoon" and "Half Life"). On 17 August 2009 Heap made the album available for live streaming via her webpage. The album can no longer be streamed via her webpage but was moved to SoundCloud.

Background
The album's title is taken from Heap's elliptical-shaped home in Essex, England wherein she began work on the project. The album's artwork was created using pictures from Flickr taken by fans. She composed and wrote all of the songs on the album prior to recording them in the studio, and recorded all of the vocals for the album in one month. During the making of the album, she frequently uploaded early studio mixes of its songs online in order to receive feedback from fans.

In July 2009, a promotional copy of the album (designed by Andy Hau) appeared on eBay; Heap in return placed a bid of £10,000,000 to try to reclaim the album, which eBay rejected. As of 8 July, eBay had ended the auction. On 14 July, the first single "First Train Home" was released, and a digital pre-order for the album became available on iTunes in two versions.

The deluxe version includes instrumental tracks of the entire album. Both standard and deluxe editions feature a "Behind the scenes" video when pre-ordered. As the song "The Fire" is already an instrumental, the "instrumental" version on the Deluxe edition's second disc consists of just the crackling fire in the background of the song proper. The solo piano track, without the fire sounds, was included only on the Deluxe CD copy of the album, as a hidden track at the end of "Half Life"; digital copies omit this hidden track.

Composition
Many of the songs on Ellipse sample sounds recorded from around Heap's house, including the sound of water hitting the kitchen sink, a jack-in-the-box, and a banister.

The song "Swoon" features a theremin-like sound, inspired by a tweet from a fan suggesting that she include a theremin on the album. The instrumentation of "Tidal" includes a pitched-down flute played by Ashwin Srinivasan, acoustic guitar played by Heap, synths, and a Game Boy made into a makeshift keyboard by Heap's friend. The song also features vocals from Srinivasan.

Critical reception

Critical response to Ellipse was generally positive. At Metacritic, which assigns a normalized rating out of 100 to reviews from mainstream critics, the album received an average score of 68, based on 12 reviews. It also earned her a further two Grammy Nominations on 2 December for Best Pop Instrumental Performance for "The Fire" and Best Engineered Non-Classical Album. On 31 January 2010, it was announced that Heap had won the latter award.

Commercial performance
As of 2011, the album had sold 161,000 copies in United States.

Live performances
In October 2008, Heap travelled to America to perform at Pop!Tech in Camden, Maine. She performed the song 'Wait It Out' live, for the first time ever on 24 October. The performance was recorded and released on Youtube.com the following day.

On 24 August 2009, Heap appeared on the Late Show with David Letterman (although the episode didn't air until the 28th) and performed "First Train Home".  On her Twitter page, Imogen admitted that she messed up on the second line of the second verse during the performance.

The following day, on 25 August, Imogen headed to the WNYC Radio Station in New York to play "First Train Home" and "Half Life" on air and give a short interview.

Track listing

Personnel
Credits adapted from Tidal.
 Imogen Heapvocals, production, mixing, engineering, programming
 Ashwin Srinivasanbackground vocals (track 6), flute (track 6)
 Leo Abrahamselectric guitar (tracks 2, 6)
 Oli Langfordviolin (tracks 2, 6, 910, 1213)
 Ian Burdgecello (tracks 6, 8, 10, 1213)
 Richie Millsdrums (tracks 6, 9)
 Arve Henriksentrumpet (tracks 8, 13)
 Simon Heyworthmastering

Production

 Jennie Hancockprojection production
 Ewan Robertsonprojection production
 Andy Haulogo
 Mark Woodmanagement
 Richard Bulldesign
 Annelieke Bosdijkprojections
 Albert Q Buiprojections
 Jessica Butlerprojections
 Alex Carmichalprojections
 Randall Dameronprojections
 J. Daniel Geddisprojections
 Vladislav Gusarovprojections
 Adriane Lakeprojections
 Nick Moulakisprojections
 Nathan Nyeprojections
 Michelle Thomasprojections
 Jeremy Cowartphotography

Charts

Weekly charts

Year-end charts

Release history

References

Imogen Heap albums
2009 albums
Grammy Award for Best Engineered Album, Non-Classical
Albums produced by Imogen Heap